Tillangchong, also known as Tillanchang, is an island and a village in the Nicobar district of Andaman and Nicobar Islands, India.

Administration
The island belongs to the township of Nancowry of Teressa Taluk.

Geography
The island is a part of the Nicobar Islands chain, located in the northeast Indian Ocean between the Bay of Bengal and the Andaman Sea.

Flora and fauna
The island has the largest surviving populations of the endemic Nicobar megapode (Megapodius nicobariensis), and is a protected sanctuary.

Demographics 

At the time of 2011 census, the island was largely uninhabited apart from a police post at Novara Bay, with several Policemen and their families, with the island being held sacred to the Nicobarese people, who visit in one season annually to "...to pray, to feel, and to revere...".

According to the 2011 census of India, Tillang Chong Island has 4 households. The effective literacy rate (i.e. the literacy rate of population excluding children aged 6 and below) is 89.47%.

Image gallery

References 

Islands of the Andaman and Nicobar Islands
Villages in Nancowry tehsil
Islands of India
Populated places in India
Islands of the Bay of Bengal